The Best of Van Morrison Volume Two is a compilation album by Northern Irish singer-songwriter Van Morrison released in 1993.

Morrison chose the tracks for this album himself. It is mostly drawn from his work during 1984–1991. "Real Real Gone" from the 1990 album Enlightenment was the only song included that was a fairly successful single. The other songs were not well known except for among longtime fans. They were a good example of his more idiosyncratic material that had been prevalent during this period when his work was mostly about spiritual searches for fulfillment. But also included were a 1960s Them cover of John Lee Hooker's "Don't Look Back" and "It's All Over Now, Baby Blue" a Bob Dylan cover.

Track listing
All songs written by Van Morrison except as indicated.

"Real Real Gone" – 3:42
 from Enlightenment, 1990
"When Will I Ever Learn to Live in God?" – 5:39
 from Avalon Sunset, 1989
"Sometimes I Feel Like a Motherless Child" (Traditional) – 4:27
 from Poetic Champions Compose, 1987
"In the Garden" – 5:46
 from No Guru, No Method, No Teacher, 1986
"A Sense of Wonder" – 7:12
 from A Sense of Wonder, 1985
"I'll Tell Me Ma" (Traditional) – 2:31
 with The Chieftains
 from Irish Heartbeat, 1988
"Coney Island" – 2:03
 from Avalon Sunset, 1989
"Enlightenment" – 4:07
 from Enlightenment, 1990
"Rave on, John Donne/Rave On, Part Two" (Live) – 9:17
 from Live at the Grand Opera House Belfast, 1984
"Don't Look Back" (John Lee Hooker) – 3:20
 with Them
 from The Angry Young Them, 1965
"It's All Over Now, Baby Blue" (Bob Dylan) – 3:51
 with Them
 from Them Again, 1966
"One Irish Rover" – 3:28
 from No Guru, No Method, No Teacher, 1986
"The Mystery" – 5:17
 from Poetic Champions Compose, 1987
"Hymns to the Silence" – 9:33
 from Hymns to the Silence, 1991
"Evening Meditation" {instrumental} – 4:14
 from A Sense of Wonder, 1985

Charts

Weekly charts

Year-end charts

References

1993 greatest hits albums
Albums produced by Van Morrison
Van Morrison compilation albums
Polydor Records compilation albums